The Grifters is a 1990 American neo-noir crime thriller film directed by Stephen Frears, produced by Martin Scorsese, and starring John Cusack, Anjelica Huston, and Annette Bening. The screenplay was written by Donald E. Westlake, based on Jim Thompson's 1963 novel of the same name. The film won the Independent Spirit Award for Best Film and was declared one of the Top 10 films of 1990 by The National Board of Review of Motion Pictures.

Plot
Lilly Dillon is a veteran con artist. She works for Bobo Justus, a mob bookmaker, making large cash bets at race tracks to lower the odds of longshots. On her way to La Jolla for a race, she stops in Los Angeles to visit her son, Roy, a small-time grifter she has not seen in eight years. She finds him in pain and bleeding internally after one of his victims caught him pulling a petty scam and hit him in the stomach with a bat. When medical assistance finally comes, Lilly confronts the doctor, threatening to have him killed if her son dies.

At the hospital, Lilly meets and takes an instant dislike to Roy's girlfriend, Myra Langtry, who is slightly older than her son. Lilly urges her son to quit the grift, saying he isn't "tough enough." Because she leaves late for La Jolla, she misses a race where the winner pays 70 to 1. For this mistake, Bobo punches her in the stomach and insinuates he will beat her with oranges wrapped in a towel, causing permanent damage, but at the last minute, he burns her hand with a cigar instead.

Myra, like Roy and Lilly, is also a con artist. She uses her sex appeal on a jeweler to get what she wants for a bracelet she is trying to pawn, and when her landlord demands payment of late rent, she lures him into bed in lieu of paying him the money.

Upon leaving the hospital, Roy takes Myra to La Jolla for the weekend. On the train, she sees him conning a group of sailors in a rigged dice game. Myra reveals to Roy that she is also a grifter and is looking for a new partner for a long con. She describes her association with a con man named Cole Langley and how they took advantage of wealthy marks in business cons, including a greedy oil investor, Gloucester Hebbing, culminating in a fake FBI raid in which Myra feigned being shot to death to discourage Hebbing from going to the police.

Roy, who insists on working only short-term cons, resists the proposition, fearing she may try to dupe him. Myra, seeing Lilly's power over Roy, accuses him of having an incestuous interest in Lilly. Infuriated, Roy strikes her. Thirsty for revenge, Myra finds out Lilly has been stealing from Bobo over the years and stashing the money in the trunk of her car, and she leaks this information to him. Lilly is warned by a friend and flees. Myra follows her to a remote motel, intending to kill her there and steal the money for herself.

Later, Roy is called by the Phoenix police to identify his mother's body, found in a motel room with the face disfigured by a gunshot wound. Though he tells them it is Lilly, he notices the body lacks the cigar burn that he had noticed on Lilly earlier. He returns home to find Lilly has broken in to steal his money. Lilly reveals she shot Myra in self-defense at the motel while she was trying to strangle her. She arranged the scene to appear as though Myra's body was her own and that she had committed suicide. When Roy refuses to let Lilly take his money, she desperately pleads with him, then attempts to seduce him, even claiming that he is not really her son. Roy is disgusted and rejects her. Lilly angrily swings a briefcase at Roy just as he is taking a drink of water, shattering the glass and sending shards into his neck, which cause him to bleed to death. Sobbing over her son's body, Lilly gathers up the money and disappears into the night.

Cast
 John Cusack as Roy Dillon
 Anjelica Huston as Lilly Dillon
 Annette Bening as Myra Langtry
 Pat Hingle as Bobo Justus
 J.T. Walsh as Cole
 Charles Napier as Gloucester Hebbing
 Henry Jones as Mr. Simms
 Gailard Sartain as Joe
 Noelle Harling as Nurse Carol Flynn
 Paul Adelstein as Sailor - Young Paul
 Jeremy Piven as Sailor - Freshman
 Stephen Tobolowsky as The Jeweler
 Xander Berkeley as Lieutenant Pierson
 Frances Bay as Motel Clerk
 Sandy Baron as The Doctor
Making uncredited appearances are Martin Scorsese as the opening narrator, Juliet Landau as Young Myra, Andy Dick as Kaggs.

Production
The project originated with Martin Scorsese who subsequently brought in Stephen Frears to direct while he produced. Frears had just finished making Dangerous Liaisons and was looking for another project when Scorsese approached him. The British filmmaker was drawn to Thompson's "tough and very stylistic" writing and described it, "as if pulp fiction meets Greek tragedy". Scorsese looked for a screenwriter, and filmmaker Volker Schlöndorff recommended Donald Westlake.

Frears contacted Westlake who agreed to reread the Thompson novel but, after doing so, turned the project down, citing the story as "too gloomy." Frears then phoned Westlake and convinced him that he saw the story as a positive one if considered as a story of Lilly's drive to survive. Westlake changed his mind and agreed to write the adaptation. Frears was unsuccessful, however, at convincing Westlake to write the script under his pseudonym "Richard Stark," a name he had used to write 20 noir-influenced crime novels from 1962 through 1974. Westlake said that "I got out of that one by explaining Richard Stark wasn't a member of the Writer's Guild. I don't think he's a joiner, actually." (Stark's name appears in the film, though, on a sign reading "Stark, Coe and Fellows"; Westlake explains in the film's commentary track that he has written novels as Richard Stark, Tucker Coe and "some other fellows.")

Meanwhile, John Cusack had read Jim Thompson's novel in 1985 and was so impressed by it that he wanted to turn the book into a film himself. When Cusack found out that Scorsese and Frears were planning an adaptation, he actively pursued a role in the project. Cusack has said that he saw the character of Roy Dillon as "a wonderfully twisted role to dive into." To research his role, he studied with real grifters and learned card and dice tricks as well as sleight-of-hand tricks like the $20 switch that his character does in the film. He even successfully pulled off this trick at a bar on a bartender he knew well.

For the role of Lilly, Frears originally considered Cher but she became too expensive after the success of Moonstruck. Sissy Spacek also read the part of Lilly Dillon.

Frears first contacted Anjelica Huston about playing Lilly in 1989 while she was filming Crimes and Misdemeanors, but after reading the script, she was unsure.
Although she was "transfixed" by the story and the character, a scene in the script where Lilly is beaten so violently by Bobo Justus with a sack of oranges that she defecates alarmed her with its explicitness. A few months later, Frears contacted Huston again to see if she was still interested. Still wavering, Huston's talent agent Sue Mengers told her bluntly "Anjelica, if Stephen Frears tells you he wants you to shit in the corner, then that's what you must do." The next day Huston auditioned for the role in front of Frears at the Chateau Marmont. Frears' initial reluctance to cast Huston because she looked too much like "a lady", was resolved with the decision to cheapen her look with a bleached blond wig and "vulgar clothes." To research her part, she studied women dealers at card parlors in Los Angeles County, California.

The shoot was emotionally challenging for Huston. After completing the final scene between Lilly and Roy, she was so drained from the experience that she ran from the set and the studio. It took her hours to recover. After shooting the scene where Bobo Justus tortures Lilly for betraying him, Huston was so affected by the rough quality of the scene (which did not make the final cut of the film) that she spent that night throwing up.

Annette Bening explained she accepted to get full frontally nude in this film because she felt the scenes were comedic rather than dramatic. "I thought I could do them because of the context it was in. It made sense to me. It was appropriate to the part, it wasn't exploitative," she said.

Reception
The Grifters had its world premiere on September 14, 1990, at the Toronto Festival of Festivals at the Elgin Theater. The film had a brief Academy Award-qualifying run in New York City and Los Angeles before opening wide in January.

The film received positive reviews from critics. On Rotten Tomatoes it holds a 91% rating based on 45 reviews.

Roger Ebert of the Chicago Sun-Times gave it 4 out of 4 and wrote "This is a movie of plot, not episode. It's not just a series of things that happen to the characters, but a web, a maze of consequences."

Box office
The movie was successful in its limited run.

Accolades

References

External links

 The Washington Post Reviews: Hal Hinson, Desson Howe.
 Roger Ebert's review: 
 
 
 
 

Films directed by Stephen Frears
1990 films
1990s crime drama films
American crime drama films
American heist films
Films about gambling
American neo-noir films
Films about con artists
Films based on American novels
Edgar Award-winning works
Films shot in California
1990 independent films
Independent Spirit Award for Best Film winners
Films scored by Elmer Bernstein
Films about fraud
Films based on Jim Thompson novels
Films produced by Martin Scorsese
Alliance Atlantis films
1990s English-language films
Films about mother–son relationships
Filicide in fiction
1990s American films